is a passenger railway station located in the city of Sayama, Saitama, Japan, operated by Seibu Railway.

Lines
Shin-Sayama Station is served by the Seibu Shinjuku Line between Seibu Shinjuku Station in Tokyo and Hon-Kawagoe Station in Kawagoe, and is located 41.3 km from the Seibu Shinjuku terminus.

Station layout
The station consists of two side platforms serving two tracks. The station building is elevated and located above and at a right angle to the platforms.

Platforms

History
The station opened on 15 November 1964.

Station numbering was introduced on all Seibu Railway lines during fiscal 2012, with Shin-Sayama Station becoming "SS27".

Passenger statistics
In fiscal 2019, the station was the 52nd busiest on the Seibu network with an average of 20,559 passengers daily.

The passenger figures for previous years are as shown below.

Surrounding area
 Bunri University of Hospitality

References

External links

 Shin-Sayama Station information (Seibu Railway) 

Railway stations in Japan opened in 1964
Railway stations in Saitama Prefecture
Stations of Seibu Railway
Sayama